The first Marlin-Romeo cabinet was the seventh cabinet of Sint Maarten. It was a caretaker government formed by the United Democrats – a merger of the United People's Party (5 seats) and the Democratic Party (2 seats), which was joined by the independent Member of Parliament Chanel Brownbill. The cabinet was installed by Governor Eugene Holiday on 15 January 2018 and was led by Prime Minister Leona Marlin-Romeo.

The caretaker government was formed following the collapse of the second Marlin cabinet in November 2017, when the Democratic Party and Chanel Brownbill (USP) pulled their support from the National Alliance-led coalition.

Composition

References

Marlin-Romeo I
Marlin-Romeo I
Marlin-Romeo I
Marlin-Romeo I
Marlin-Romeo I
Marlin-Romeo I